William Henry  (12 December 17742 September 1836) was an English chemist. He was the son of Thomas Henry and was born in Manchester England. He developed what is known today as Henry's Law.

Life
William Henry was apprenticed to Thomas Percival and later worked with John Ferriar & John Huit at the Manchesters Infirmary. He began to study medicine at University of Edinburgh in 1795, taking his medical in 1807, but ill-health interrupted his practice as a physician, and he devoted his time mainly to chemical research, especially with regard to gases. One of his best-known papers (published in Philosophical Transactions of the Royal Society, 1803) describes experiments on the quantity of gases absorbed by water at different temperatures and under different pressures. His results are known today as Henry's law. His other papers deal with gas-analysis, fire-damp, illuminating gas, the composition of hydrochloric acid and of ammonia, urinary and other morbid concretions, and the disinfecting powers of heat. His Elements of Experimental Chemistry (1799) enjoyed considerable vogue in its day, going through eleven editions in 30 years. He was one of the founders of the Mechanics' Institute, the original precursor of University of Manchester Institute of Science and Technology. (The eponymous Henry's pocket, the notch on the posterior of the external ear of the domestic cat, some dog breeds, and a few other mammals, was minor contribution to science.)                                                                              

He was elected a Fellow of the Royal Society in February 1809, having been awarded their prestigious Copley Medal in 1808.

He shot himself in his private chapel at Pendlebury, near Manchester, in 1836.

See also
Mercury beating heart
Henry adsorption constant

Notes

References

Further reading
Elwood, Willis J. & Tuxford, A. Felicité (eds.) (1984) Some Manchester Doctors: a biographical collection to mark the 150th anniversary of the Manchester Medical Society, 1834-1984. Manchester: Manchester University Press
Henry, William Charles (1837) A Biographical Account of the late Dr Henry. Manchester: F. Looney (Dr William Charles Henry, also known as Dr Charles Henry, was a son of William Henry; he donated the first collection of scientific books to the Owens College Library in 1851.)

External links

1774 births
1836 deaths
Scientists from Manchester
People associated with the University of Manchester Institute of Science and Technology
19th-century British chemists
Recipients of the Copley Medal
Fellows of the Royal Society
Alumni of the University of Edinburgh
Manchester Literary and Philosophical Society